Sir Syed Sultan Ahmed, KCSI (1880–1963, Patna, Bengal Presidency, British India)
was an Indian barrister and politician who had a highly successful practice as a barrister, having victories over Motilal Nehru, Tej Bahadur Sapru and Sarat Chandra Bose. He was related to Sir Ali Imam and Syed Hasan Imam, who were also from Bihar.

He was the first Indian vice-chancellor of Patna University (1923–30). As a delegate from British India, he attended the Round Table Conference (1930–31) in London, which was also attended by Mahatma Gandhi.

He was elected a member of the Bihar Legislative Council in 1937, but resigned on the grounds that he was too busy and could not find time for politics. He joined the Viceroy’s Executive Council (1941–43) and was made the Member for Information and Broadcasting. Later he was also Advisor to the Chamber of Princes (1945–47) in India. In the 1945 New Year Honours, he was appointed a Knight Commander of the Order of the Star of India (KCSI). 

He supported M. C. Davar in his opposition to the partition of India, joining the United Party of India which aimed at bridging the gap between the Indian National Congress and the All India Muslim League.

Jinnah offered him a cabinet position in Pakistan, but he declined, saying that he could not leave India as it contained the graves of his forefathers. He had previously also refused the Nizam of Hyderabad's offer of being his prime minister as his father, who himself was a lawyer, reminded him of the bad experiences of his relative Sir Ali Imam in that role.

After Indian Independence, he focused on his law practice. In 1950 he became the president of the All India Shia Conference.

His grandson, Syed Tanvirul Hasan’s book ‘Freedom and Partition and Seasons Changed’ records the ‘Life and Times of Sir Sultan Ahmed’.

However, prior to Tanvirul Hassan's book, which was published in 2007, a very comprehensive biography in Urdu with all important details and other references of related history was published by Ataullah Palvi in the June 1963, just three months after Sir Sultan's death, issue of the monthly "Nusrat", Lahore, Pakistan. It was a 50-page write-up titled as "Dr. Sir Syed Sultan Ahmad". Ataullah Palvi was a Sunni Muslim, but he and his family were great admirers of Sir Sultan Ahmad. Ataullah belonged to the same village of Pali, Bihar, which was also of Sir Sultan Ahmad.

Sir Sultan edited the most popular book on Muslim Law "Mohammedan Law" for many years.

References

1880 births
1963 deaths
Indian knights
Knights Commander of the Order of the Star of India
Bihari politicians
Indian barristers
Indian Shia Muslims
Politicians from Patna
Academic staff of Patna University
20th-century Indian lawyers
Patna University alumni
Members of the Council of the Governor General of India
Lawyers in British India